Exilisia prominentia is a moth of the subfamily Arctiinae. It was described by Lars Kühne in 2007. It is found in Kenya.

References

Endemic moths of Kenya
Lithosiini
Moths described in 2007